"You Alone" is the lead single on Kutless's eighth studio album Glory. It was released on October 15, 2013, by BEC Recordings, and it was co-written by Dave Lubben, James Mead, Nick De Partee and produced by Lubben.

Weekly charts

References 

2013 singles
Kutless songs
2013 songs